General Keyes may refer to:

Charles Patton Keyes (1822–1896), British Indian Army general
Erasmus D. Keyes (1810–1895), Union Army major general
Geoffrey Keyes (1888–1967), U.S. Army lieutenant general
Terence Keyes (1877–1939), British Indian Army brigadier general

See also
Ronald Keys (born 1945), U.S. Air Force general
William M. Keys (born 1937), U.S. Marine Corps lieutenant general